Deinacrida talpa, the giant mole weta, is a species of insect in the family Anostostomatidae. It is endemic to New Zealand. Although the species is similar to closely related species, its key distinguishing factor is their ability to live in burrows dug by the weta.  The Department of Conservation assessed its status as "At Risk: Naturally Uncommon".

References

Weta
Anostostomatidae
Insects described in 1999